Nenashev is a Russian masculine surname, its feminine counterpart is Nenasheva. It may refer to
Alexander Graf (born Alexander Nenashev in 1962), Uzbekistani-German chess grandmaster
Mikhail Nenashev (1960–2021), Russian politician
Stanislav Nenashev (born 1934), Soviet hammer thrower

Russian-language surnames